HIFF may refer to:

Hamptons International Film Festival
Harlem International Film Festival
Hawaii International Film Festival
Helsinki International Film Festival
Hyderabad International Film Festival
Haifa Independent Film Festival
Heartland Film Festival